Iffat Miraj Awan (born 15 October 1971) is a Pakistani politician who had been a Member of the Provincial Assembly of the Punjab, from May 2013 to May 2018.

Early life and education

Awan was born on 15 October 1971 in Jaranwala.

She graduated from University of the Punjab in 1995 and has the degree of Bachelor of Arts.

Political career

She was elected to the Provincial Assembly of the Punjab as a candidate of Pakistan Muslim League (N) (PML-N) from Constituency PP-53 (Faisalabad-III) in 2013 Pakistani general election. He received 44,754 votes and defeated Malik Zafar Iqbal Khokhar, a candidate of Pakistan Tehreek-e-Insaf (PTI).

References

Living people
Punjab MPAs 2013–2018
1971 births
Pakistan Muslim League (N) MPAs (Punjab)